Loton, also called Lotton or Lautan a village located in Ambala District, Haryana, India. It is located near Naraingarh and situated in Naraingarh Mandal. The village panchayat has 1755 habitations with 100% Population Coverage as in 2010.

Lotton is 1 km far from Mandal and 36.1 km away from its district headquarters Ambala-I and 60 km from its state capital Chandigarh.

See also
Harbon

References

Villages in Ambala district